Wee MacGregor's Sweetheart is a 1922 British silent romance film directed by George Pearson and starring Betty Balfour, Donald Macardle and Nora Swinburne.

Plot
In Scotland, young Christina weds young MacGregor, despite objections from Christina's snobbish aunt.

Cast

 Betty Balfour as Christine  
 Donald Macardle as Wee MacGregor  
 Nora Swinburne as Jessie Mary  
 Cyril Percival as Uncle Baldwin  
 Minna Grey as Mary Purvis  
 M.A. Wetherell as John Robertson  
 Bryan Powley as Uncle Purdie  
 Mabel Archdale as Aunt Purdie  
 Lillian Christine as Lizzie  
 Marie Ault as Miss Todd  
 Bunty Fosse as Christina as a Child

References

Bibliography
 Low, Rachael. The History of the British Film 1918-1929. George Allen & Unwin, 1971.

External links
 

1922 films
1920s romance films
British romance films
British silent feature films
1920s English-language films
Films directed by George Pearson
British black-and-white films
1920s British films
English-language romance films